Harold Whittlesey McGraw Jr. (January 10, 1918 – March 24, 2010) was chief executive officer (CEO) of Mcgraw-Hill from 1975 to 1983. He was the eldest of two sons born to Harold Sr. & Louise (née Higgins) McGraw and grandson of McGraw-Hill’s co-founder James H. McGraw and his wife, Mildred. His son is former CEO Harold McGraw III. Harold McGraw Jr. was a captain in the United States Army Air Forces during World War II. He joined McGraw-Hill in 1947 and retired in 1988.

Awards and honors
Recipient of the 1999 Honor Award from the National Building Museum.

References

External links
McGraw-Hill Companies
List of Honor Award Winners

1918 births
2010 deaths
American publishing chief executives
American publishers (people)
Businesspeople from New York City
People from Darien, Connecticut
Princeton University alumni
United States Army Air Forces personnel of World War II
Lawrenceville School alumni
20th-century American businesspeople
United States Army Air Forces officers